The 2005–06 season was the 104th season of competitive football in Italy. Due to a match fixing scandal, the Serie A title was awarded to Inter Milan instead of Juventus, and were also relegated to Serie B the following season for the first time in its history. Juventus were also stripped of the previous season's Serie A title.

Promotions and relegations (pre-season)
Teams promoted to Serie A
 Empoli
 Treviso
 Ascoli

Teams relegated from Serie A
  Bologna
  Brescia
  Atalanta

Teams promoted to Serie B
 Cremonese
 Mantova
 Rimini
 Avellino

Teams relegated from Serie B
 Perugia
 Salernitana
 Venezia
 Genoa

League table

Serie A

Serie B

National team

References

 
Seasons in Italian football
2005 in Italian sport
2005 in association football
2006 in Italian sport
2006 in association football